Billbergia morelii is a plant species in the genus Billbergia. This species is endemic to Brazil.

Cultivars
 Billbergia 'Andegavensis'
 Billbergia 'Belgica'
 Billbergia 'Frolic'
 Billbergia 'Full Moon'
 Billbergia 'Gargoyle'
 Billbergia 'Jenischiana'
 Billbergia 'Koechlii'
 Billbergia 'Makoyana'
 Billbergia 'Margarita'
 Billbergia 'Vexillaria'
 Billbergia 'Wantenii'
 Billbergia 'Worleana'

References

BSI Cultivar Registry Retrieved 11 October 2009

morelii
Endemic flora of Brazil
Flora of the Atlantic Forest
Garden plants of South America
Taxa named by Adolphe-Théodore Brongniart